Richard A. Florsheim (1916 – 1979) was an American painter, lithographer, and sculptor. His work is in the permanent collections of the Art Institute of Chicago, the Smithsonian American Art Museum, and the Whitney Museum of American Art.

Further reading

References

1916 births
1979 deaths
American lithographers
American male painters
American male sculptors
Artists from Chicago
University of Chicago alumni
20th-century American painters
20th-century American sculptors
20th-century American male artists
20th-century lithographers